Microcephaly lymphoedema chorioretinal dysplasia  is a genetic condition associated with:
Small head (Microcephaly)
Puffy feet (Lymphoedema)
Eye problems (Chorio-retinal dysplasia i.e. changes in the retina)

In 1992, Feingold and Bartoshesky described two unrelated children with microcephaly, lymphoedema and chorioretinal dysplasia (MIM 152950) as a distinct entity. Since then there have been further reports of children with these three features (Angle et al. 1994, Fryns et al. 1995, Limwongse et al. 1999, Casteels et al. 2001)

Children have also been seen with two of the above features:
Microcephaly and lymphoedema
Microcephaly and  chorioretinal dysplasia with or without intellectual disability

Presentation
The distinct facial feature include upslanting palpebral fissures, a broad nose with rounded tip, long philtrum with a thin upper lip, pointed chin and prominent ears (Vasudevan 2005)

Genetics
The former (microcephaly and lymphoedema) has been described as an autosomal dominant (MIM 156590) or X-linked trait, while the latter (microcephaly and chorioretinal dysplasia) has been described as autosomal dominant, autosomal recessive (MIM 251270 or Mirhosseini-Holmes-Walton syndrome) or X-linked trait.

Diagnosis

References 
1. Feingold M, Bartoshesky L (1992) Microcephaly, lymphoedema, and chorioretinal dysplasia: a distinct syndrome? Am J Med Genet; 43:1030-1031.
2. Angle B, Holgado S, Burton BK (1994) Microcephaly, lymphoedema, and chorioretinal dysplasia: report of two additional cases. Am J Med Genet; 53:99-101
3. Fryns JP, Smeets E, Van den Berghe H. (1995) On the nosology of the "primary true microcephaly, chorioretinal dysplasia, lymphoedema" association. Clin Genet; 48:131-133
4.Limwongse C, Wyszynski RE, Dickerman LH, Robin NH (1999) Microcephaly-lymphoedema-chorioretinal dysplasia: a unique genetic syndrome with variable expression and possible characteristic facial appearance. Am J Med Genet; 86:215-218.
5. Casteels I, Devriendt K, Van Cleynenbreugel H, Demaerel P, De Tavernier F, Fryns JP (2001). Autosomal dominant microcephaly—lymphoedema-chorioretinal dysplasia syndrome. Br J Ophthalmol.; 85(4):499-500
6.Crowe CA, Dickerman LH (1986). A genetic association between microcephaly and lymphoedema. Am J Med Genet; 24:131-135.
7.Vasudevan, Pradeep C, Garcia-Minaur, Sixto, Botella, Maria Pilar, Perez-Aytes, Antonio, Shannon, Nora L, Quarrell Oliver W. J (2005) Microcephaly-lymphoedema-chorioretinal dysplasia: three cases to delineate the facial phenotype and review of the literature. Clinical Dysmorphology: July 2005 - Volume 14 - Issue 3 - pp 109–116

External links 

Genetic diseases and disorders